Mysterious Island is a "port-of-call" (themed land) at Tokyo DisneySea in the Tokyo Disney Resort. It features a large volcano and is located in the center of the park.

Theming

Mysterious Island is a recreation of the fictitious one in Jules Verne's novel, The Mysterious Island, which serves as Captain Nemo's lair. It is also known as Vulcania Island, as featured in the Disney movie 20,000 Leagues Under the Sea. When guests enter the area, they discover Nemo's secret base, complete with a harbor for his Nautilus, as well as a lab inside the volcano, known as Mount Prometheus. Nemo is exploring the depths of the sea and of the earth, which allows guests to experience two of Verne's most famous adventures: 20,000 Leagues Under the Sea and Journey to the Center of the Earth.

Despite its name, Mysterious Island is not an actual island. It is instead built into the side of Mount Prometheus. This volcano is "active" (bursts of fire can be seen escaping from the top, bursts of steam from cracks in its side, and bursts of water from the lake). The area has some greenery, and is mostly rocks and ornaments (as one can see in the film).

Attractions and entertainment 
 Journey to the Center of the Earth
 20,000 Leagues Under the Sea

Restaurants and refreshments 

 Vulcania Restaurant- A counter-service restaurant that serves Chinese food inside of Mount Prometheus.
 Nautilus Galley-A snack stand by the water.
 Refreshment Station-A food stand that serves Chinese-style steamed buns with sausage filling.

Shopping 

 Nautilus Gifts

External links
 TDR Fan - Mysterious Island Photos

References

 
Themed areas in Walt Disney Parks and Resorts
Tokyo DisneySea
Steampunk
Amusement rides based on works by Jules Verne
Fictional islands
Amusement rides introduced in 2001
Works based on The Mysterious Island